VFRS may refer to:

 Vaughan Fire and Rescue Services in Vaughan, Ontario
 Vancouver Fire and Rescue Services in Vancouver, British Columbia
 Vernon Fire Rescue Services in Vernon, British Columbia
 Volunteer Fire and Rescue Service as a general term